Léon Gandillot (20-25 January 1862  – 21 September 1912) was a French playwright.

Gandillot was the nephew of the librettist and dramatist Hector Crémieux. In 1886, his first comédie en vaudeville Les Femmes collantes gave him the opportunity to be known very quickly. He later gained other successes with comedies such as La Mariée récalcitrante, La Course aux jupons, and Ferdinand le noceur.

Works 

1886: Les femmes collantes, comédie-bouffe in 5 acts; 
1887: Les filles de Jean de Nivelle, novel, H. Kistemaeckers
1887: Le fumeron, comedy in 1 act; Paul Ollendorff
1887: Vers amoureux, collection of poems; Alphonse Piaget
1887: Contes à la lune, short stories; Librairie illustrée
1888: Entre conjoints !, short story; H. Kistemaeckers
1888: Un rendez-vous, comedy in i act; Paul Ollendorff
1888: Tes seins, poems; Librairie nouvelle
1889: La mariée récalcitrante, comédie-bouffe in cinq acts; Paul Ollendorff
1890: La course aux jupons, comedy in 3 acts; Paul Ollendorff
1890: La Diva en tournée, comedy in 1 act; Paul Ollendorff
1890: L'Enlèvement de Sabine, comédie-bouffe in 3 acts; Paul Ollendorff
1890: Le Gros lot, comedy in 1 act; Paul Ollendorff
1891: Bonheur à quatre, comedy in 3 acts; Paul Ollendorff
1891: De fil en aiguille,  scènes de la vie folâtre in 4 days; Paul Ollendorff
1892: Le Pardon, comedy in 3 acts; Paul Ollendorff
1892: La Tournée Ernestin, comédie inédite in 4 acts
1893: Le Sous-Préfet de Château-Buzard, comédie inédite in 3 acts
1893: Le Supplice d'un Auvergnat, comedy in 1 act, mingled with song; Paul Ollendorff
1894: Les Dames du Plessis-Rouge, five-act play; Paul Ollendorff
1894: Une Femme facile, comedy in 1 act; Paul Ollendorff
1895: Associés !, comedy in 3 acts; Paul Ollendorff
1895: La Cage aux lions, comédie-bouffe inédite in 3 acts
1895: Ferdinand le noceur, comedy in 1 act; l'Illustration
1896: La Tortue, comédie inédite in 3 acts
1896: La Villa Gaby, comédie inédite in 3 acts; l'Illustration
1897: Madame Jalouette, comédie inédite in 3 acts
1898: L'Amorceur, comédie inédite in 4 acts
1900: Zigomar, pièce inédite in 3 acts
1901: Radinol a du coton !, comédie-bouffe inédite in 3 acts (in collaboration with M. Landais)
1905: Le Devoir conjugal, comédie inédite in 3 acts
1905: Vers l'amour, five-act play; l'Illustration
1909: Euterpé ambigua, texte;  Société Internationale de musicologie
1909: L'Ex, comédie inédite in 4 acts
1910: Les Pigeonnettes, comédie-bouffe inédite in 3 acts (in collaboration with Alphonse de Beil)
1911: Sauvé des eaux, comédie inédite in 1 act; Je sais tout

References 

 

19th-century French dramatists and playwrights
20th-century French dramatists and playwrights
Chevaliers of the Légion d'honneur
1862 births
Writers from Paris
1912 deaths